Brian Wilson Presents Smile (also referred to as Smile or the abbreviation BWPS) is the fifth studio album by American musician Brian Wilson, released on September 28, 2004 on Nonesuch. It features all-new recordings of music that he had originally created for Smile, an unfinished album by the Beach Boys that he abandoned in 1967.  Revisiting Smile was an intense emotional undertaking for Wilson, as he had been deeply traumatized by the circumstances that had originally surrounded the project.

Wilson initially agreed to revisit Smile in the form of a live concert performance as a follow-up to his 2000–2002 Pet Sounds tour. From October to November 2003, he worked with keyboardist Darian Sahanaja and original lyricist Van Dyke Parks in assembling a three-movement structure for BWPS while embellishing the material with newly written lyrics and melodies. Wilson and his band premiered it at the Royal Festival Hall in London on February 20, 2004. Motivated by the positive reception, he then adapted the performance as a studio-recorded solo album. None of the other Beach Boys were involved with BWPS, nor with the documentary that covered its making, Beautiful Dreamer: Brian Wilson and the Story of Smile.

BWPS was universally acclaimed by critics and peaked at number 13 in the US and number 7 in the UK. It earned Wilson his first Grammy Award, winning in the category of Best Rock Instrumental Performance for "Mrs. O'Leary's Cow". In 2011, the album's sequencing served as a blueprint for The Smile Sessions, a compilation dedicated to the original Beach Boys recordings. In 2020, BWPS was ranked number 399 on Rolling Stones list of "The 500 Greatest Albums of All Time". It has been certified platinum by the RIAA, indicating one hundred thousand units sold.

Background

In 1967, due to numerous difficulties surrounding the project, Brian Wilson abandoned Smile, an unfinished album that he had recorded with his band the Beach Boys, lyricist Van Dyke Parks, and numerous session musicians. The band substituted its release with Smiley Smile, a downscaled version, and a legend subsequently grew around the original Smile recordings. In the 1980s, unreleased material from its recording sessions began circulating widely on bootlegs, which inspired many fans to compile a hypothetical version of the completed album. Among these fans were Los Angeles-based musicians Darian Sahanaja, Probyn Gregory, and Nick Walusko, all of whom later formed the band Wondermints.

In 1995, Wilson reteamed with Parks for the collaborative album Orange Crate Art, which provoked speculation regarding a future release of Smile. Instead, Wilson indicated that he was more interested in completing a forthcoming collaboration with musician Andy Paley. That year, Paley invited Wilson to a concert at the Morgan-Wixon Theater in Los Angeles, a show which featured the Wondermints performing a rendition of "Surf's Up". After the concert, Wilson remarked to Paley, "If I'd had these guys back in '67, I could've taken Smile on the road."

In late 1998, the Wondermints accepted an offer from Wilson's wife Melinda Ledbetter to join Wilson's live band, a group that included guitarist Jeffrey Foskett, multi-instrumentalist Scott Bennett, reed player Paul Mertens, bassist Bob Lizik, and backing vocalist Taylor Mills. Their first tour was successful, and from 2000 to 2002, Wilson followed up with another, this time playing the Pet Sounds album in its entirety.

Announcement
Wilson had been psychologically scarred by the making of Smile and regarded the album as his life's greatest failure. Sahanaja recalled, "When I first met Brian, you couldn't even mention the words 'Heroes and Villains'; he'd turn around and walk away or he'd say, 'I don't want to talk about it.'" In December 2000, while at a Christmas party at Bennett's house, Wilson was playing songs on piano when the wife of biographer David Leaf called out a request for "Heroes and Villains". To the astonishment of everyone present, Wilson began playing and singing the song. He then agreed to perform the song with his band at a forthcoming tribute show held in his honor at the Radio City Music Hall in New York. At the concert, various artists performed renditions of Wilson's songs, including "Our Prayer" and "Surf's Up", with Wilson's band providing accompaniment. A performance of "Cabinessence" was considered, but dropped due to its complexity.

Following the concert, Ledbetter and Sahanaja successfully petitioned Wilson to add "Our Prayer" and "Surf's Up" into his regular setlists. "Heroes and Villains" and a medley of "Wonderful" and "Cabinessence" were also added. Within a few months, Wilson performed "Prayer" and "Heroes" during his appearance on Late Night with Conan O'Brien. According to Sahanaja, "It was like little baby steps all the way." While rehearsing for the Pet Sounds concerts in January 2002, Sahanaja attended a lunch meeting with Wilson, Ledbetter, and Pet Sounds show promoter Glenn Maxx. At one point, someone joked, "The only thing that could ever top this is to do music from Smile". Unusual for Wilson, he did not voice an objection to the idea.

In 2003, during the recording of his forthcoming album Gettin' in over My Head, Wilson permitted his managers to schedule shows that would include the live debut of Smile. On May 22, while he was in London to accept an Ivor Novello Award for Lifetime Achievement, it was announced that Wilson and his band would perform a live interpretation of Smile in February 2004 at the Royal Festival Hall in London. Parks, who had attended the Radio City Music Hall concert, was not originally involved, nor was he contacted about the project beforehand, and only learned about it through the press.

The news elicited some mixed reactions from fans of Wilson who felt that his attempt to complete Smile would destroy the legendary quality associated with the project. Sahanaja remembered that, during their meetings over the summer, Wilson did not appear interested in the project. He said, "I knew there were a lot of people who were very familiar with this stuff, and for most of them even touching Smile was sacrilege. I was of that same mindset, but then Brian gradually started getting into it."

Preparation

Planning and collaboration

The project was not approached as an attempt to complete Smile. Initially, the band's goal was only to assemble a cohesive live set of Smile material that had been released to that point. To assist with the assembly, Sahanaja was assigned the role of "musical secretary" for Wilson, and in early autumn 2003, was sent to the Beach Boys' tape vaults to download select recordings to his laptop. Sahanaja consulted bootlegs that he had amassed since the early 1980s, as well as an archive of literature belonging to David Leaf, which included photocopies of handwritten lyric sheets that were originally given to illustrator Frank Holmes in 1966.

With Pro Tools session files loaded onto his Apple G3 iBook, Sahanaja joined Wilson at his home on numerous occasions to listen to the recordings and determine how they were originally supposed to function together. To relieve Wilson from the burden of deconstructing and reconstructing his own music, Sahanaja handled the task for him by transcribing the recordings as much as he possibly could, then presenting the resultant work back to him for necessary adjustments. At first, Sahanaja presented only the recurring motifs and chord patterns of the songs before moving onto any lyrics. Wilson had resisted listening to the original recordings, but eventually went through with the task. He later said that listening to the recordings "reawakened the bad feelings of the drugs, not the music. The music was good vibes. The drugs were bad vibes. I had a bad flashback, but we got over it right away."

In Sahanaja's recollection, "He'd be saying, 'Oh yeah, that's supposed to be a part of this song,' or 'Use that bit to connect these two songs here,' and it was really neat." However, on another occasion, Sahanaja said that Wilson did not assert his original ideas for the album: "Brian Wilson is not going to tell you in October/November of 2003, 'No, this was supposed to be like this.' If anything, he was terrified at first, but as he became more comfortable, we just went with his gut. And nine times out of ten, his gut is Smile."

Early in these sessions, the pair were working on the song "Do You Like Worms?" when they ran into issues reading the handwriting of its lyric sheet. Wilson swiftly phoned Parks, who he had not spoken to in years, and immediately asked what word came after "cheering". Parks asked Wilson to fax him the lyric sheet, and within minutes, Parks called back and clarified that the word was "Indians". After Wilson and Sahanaja finished their work for that day, Wilson called Parks again and had a lengthier conversation, during which Parks accepted the invitation to join the project.

Parks returned to his original role as the project's lyricist. In the interest of preserving the "integrity" of their work, Sahanaja took on a less active role, contributing to the discussions only when the songwriters were struggling with "how to pull something off live". Wilson later stated that he could recall very little of Smile until Parks entered the project. Parks himself had not listened to any of the Smile music in decades. According to Sahanaja,

Wilson, Parks, and Sahanaja configured the presentation into three movements. The third effectively constituted songs that were leftover from the other two movements, and in Sahanaja's description, "the stuff that was the riskiest" from Wilson's point of view. Sahanaja said: "At that point, he [Brian] and Van Dyke were talking as if they were finishing Smile."

Original Smile differences
According to Wilson, BWPS reimagined the original Smile concept "from scratch". Asked for a comparison, he responded that the new version was "different, much different. Much more progressive, much happier, much more uplifting." Parks provided lyrics that had been written in the 1960s but not previously documented, and some that were newly written for the project. He believed that a hypothetical 1967 version of Smile would not have been significantly different from their 2004 version.

Sahanaja believed that there were two exceptions in which Wilson clearly recalled ideas that he had originally conceived for the Smile album. One was the verse melody of "Do You Like Worms?"; the other was the pairing of "Wonderful" and "Look". Regarding the latter, Sahanaja said that "Brian just butted those two together and said, 'Yeah, that's it! That's how it goes!'" When he asked Parks if an idea was part of the original concept, Parks would only respond with, "It was inevitable."

A number of short, orchestral segues between songs were newly written for the project by Wilson, Parks, Sahanaja, and Paul Mertens. They also wrote a string arrangement for the second part of "Surf's Up", an idea that Wilson said he originally intended for the piece. Some of the titles of the original tracks were changed, including "Do You Like Worms?", which was renamed "Roll Plymouth Rock". Wilson explained that this was because "we wanted something a little more appropriate". When Wilson was presented "Mrs. O'Leary's Cow", he began humming the melody from "Fall Breaks and Back to Winter", which was then incorporated into the piece.

In Wilson's words, "We [first] thought of it as 2-movement rock opera. Then we added a third [and] we called it a 3-movement rock opera." The subtitles for these movements ("Americana", "Cycle of Life", and "Spiritual Rebirth—Elements") were the invention of music writer Peter Reum. In a 2011 interview, Sahanaja stated that Wilson never mentioned an "elemental" concept during these sessions: "whenever I did bring up the concept he didn't seem to react to it with any enthusiasm. I brought it up again while Van Dyke was around and didn't get a clear reaction from him either."

Besides the tracks that made it into the final presentation, nothing else from the original Smile sessions was worked on, although some recordings were presented to Wilson for consideration. Among the rejected ideas that Sahanaja played for Wilson was "He Gives Speeches", "With Me Tonight", "She's Goin' Bald", and the alternate "rock with me, Henry" version of "Wonderful".

Rehearsals

Rehearsals began in January 2004, at which point Leaf had arrived with a film crew set on documenting the project. Wilson was still intensely troubled by his memories of Smile and the prospects of performing it live. He began struggling with a resurgence of auditory hallucinations. Sahanaja recalled that, after the holiday break, when he returned to Wilson's house to prepare for the forthcoming vocal rehearsals, "I remember him shaking and he sat down and he started crying and yelling 'I'm fucked! I'm fucked!'" They attempted to work on a few songs before Wilson threw the lyric sheet across the room and began shouting from the other room, "Darian! Darian! They are trying to kill me! They are trying to kill me!"

On the first day of rehearsals, Wilson had a panic attack and drove himself to the emergency room at a nearby hospital, but calmed down within hours. His attendance for the rest of the rehearsal dates remained inconsistent, as he would leave prematurely on some days, and on others, skip them entirely. Sahanaja told biographer Mark Dillon, "There's always the question of whether you're forcing Brian to do something he doesn't want to do. But in the end, do you want a Brian Wilson who just sits at home, watching TV, or should you try to put a spark under him and get him going to the point where it is a productive, positive thing for him?"

Initial concerts

Premiere

Brian Wilson Presents Smile premiered at the Royal Festival Hall on February 20, 2004. It was bookended by two setlists consisting of regular Beach Boys hits such as "Sloop John B" and "God Only Knows", lesser-known songs such as "You're Welcome" and "Time to Get Alone", and songs from Gettin' in Over My Head. The first set was played acoustically in the style of Beach Boys' Party!; Wilson sat on a stool surrounded by his supporting band, who provided additional vocals, two guitars, bongos, and an occasional flute or harmonica part.

When Smile completed its debut, Wilson received a ten-minute standing ovation before he was able to invite Parks, who was in tears, onstage. According to Sahanaja, "the standing ovation was indescribable. I had never seen anything like it as an audience member or a performer. [...]They wouldn't let him speak or say anything. [...] I stepped up to him and said, 'Uh, Brian... I think they like SMiLE.'" For the encore, Parks performed shaker on "Do It Again". Sahanaja reported that, after the show, Wilson rocked back and forth backstage—out of relief that he had finally conquered his fear of Smile—exclaiming "Darian! Darian! We did it! We did it!"

The concerts were repeated at the same venue for every night until February 26, with each playing recorded by engineer Mark Linett for posterity on film and a 48-track Genex hard disk recorder. All the dates were sold-out, with attendees including Paul McCartney, George Martin, and Jason Pierce of Spiritualized.  A brief tour followed in England and Europe.

On September 26, 2004, a live concert of SMiLE was recorded at CenterStaging in Burbank, California, and was later released on a DVD, along with the documentary Beautiful Dreamer: Brian Wilson and the Story of Smile, directed by David Leaf.

Reviews
Critical reaction was highly favorable. The Guardian declared that it was "one of the greatest of American symphonies." John Mulvey wrote in NME; "It's rare that you can honestly say you were present at a moment of genuine historic significance. And it's rarer still that the reality of these occasions measures up to the hype." In March, GQ ranked BWPS among the "Top Five Gigs of All Time". Parks attended several more of Wilson's shows, commenting, "It's absolutely thrilling. I did two shows in London, two in New York and two in LA, and you can't help but be engaged in seeing the performance. The audience was very much a part of what the performance was all about."

Conversely, The Times Stephen Dalton was skeptical of the album's myth and felt that most of the performance "sounded like whimsical juvenilia. It was clearly adventurous for its era but, with the best will in the world, it is not difficult to see why Wilson's [...] fellow Beach Boys balked at releasing it." Mojos Jim Irvin was similarly underwhelmed; although he enjoyed the songs, he wrote, "To claim that this show was transcendent is to disregard the figure at its heart, a bewildered-looking man of 61 who barely plays the piano he's perched behind. [...] its hard to feel uplifted, as such." Critic Barney Hoskyns wrote that it was "a pretty magnificent evening", although Wilson's apathetic demeanor resembled that of an autistic person's. Hoskyns mused, "As bizarrely not-there as Brian seemed through all of this, he seemed to be enjoying himself as much as he is able to. Occasionally he flapped his arms about, and he made a big point of introducing 'Marcella' as a real 'rock'n'roll' song – as though that were what we secretly craved."

Studio recording

Motivated by the positive reception, Wilson agreed to record a studio version of Smile after two weeks of consideration.  Recording began on April 13, 2004 with his ten-piece touring band, augmented by a ten-piece string section and an acoustic bassist. The basic tracks were recorded at Sunset Sound Recorders in four days, with overdubbing and mixing continuing until July with some stops at engineer Mark Linett's Your Place or Mine studio.

When played live, digital keyboards were used to replicate the sound of various instruments such as harpsichord and tack piano, and electric drums were used in place of timpanis. These digital keyboards were kept for the album's recording, though a real upright piano and timpani was used. Some alterations were also made to tracks' specific arrangements, since they had been arranged with an audience in mind, along with the logistics of only having ten performers on stage. Linett explained: "For the studio version of Smile, Brian and the band eliminated some of the flourishes that were designed just for live performance and substantially reworked the instrumental arrangements." Most engineering for the album followed practices that were common during the 1960s, and tracks were recorded and sequenced in discrete sections the same as they would have been on the original Smile. The vocals were recorded using a Universal Audio tube mixing console identical to the one used by the Beach Boys at United Western Recorders in the 1960s.

The album was recorded onto a custom Pro Tools HD rig. Mixing was completed in late July, just as the band were to begin their tour of Europe. Wilson mostly avoided the mixing sessions. Linett said, "Brian would come in, make comments, take stuff home, then make more comments. The third time he came in, I gave him a CD and I said: 'Hey, there it is. Smile, ready to play on your CD player.' I swear you could see something change in him. And he's been different ever since." According to Sahanaja, Wilson held the CD to his chest and said, "'I'm going to hold this dear to my heart.' He was trembling."

Release

In an interview from October 2004, Wilson was asked what completing Smile had meant to him, and he responded:

On September 28, 2004, BWPS was issued on Nonesuch Records. It debuted at number 13 on the Billboard 200, the highest chart position of any album by the Beach Boys or Brian Wilson since 1976's 15 Big Ones, and it was the best-selling album on Amazon for two weeks. On September 28, Wilson appeared on The Tonight Show performing "Heroes and Villains". On October 5, Leaf's documentary Beautiful Dreamer: Brian Wilson and the Story of Smile premiered on the Showtime network. The film included interviews with Wilson and dozens of his associates, albeit none of his surviving bandmates from the Beach Boys, who declined to appear in the film. It was later included on the DVD of a Smile concert performed in Los Angeles. By February 2005, Nielson Soundscan had reported that the album had sold over 300,000 copies. It was certified platinum in combination with its international sales.

From autumn 2004 to summer 2005, Wilson supported the album with a world tour that included stops in the US, Europe, and Japan. In March 2005, Wilson, Parks, and Leaf held a panel at the annual South by Southwest convention in Austin, Texas to discuss Smile. Asked if he would permit the release of the original Beach Boys recordings, Wilson responded: "Never. Those are gone forever. I don't want those made public because they bring up bad memories. I don't think about the old days anymore. I never do." Sahanaja told Australian Musician, "In six years of touring this is the happiest we've ever seen Brian, I mean consistently happy and it's got to be because of the music. [...] Who would have thought … of all things…Smile."

Contemporary critical reception

BWPS received widespread acclaim from music critics. At Metacritic, which assigns a normalized rating out of 100 to reviews from critics, Smile received an average score of 97 based on 29 reviews, indicating "universal acclaim".

Rolling Stones Robert Christgau, who was skeptical of Smile back in the 1960s, praised Parks' lyrics and wrote, "what elevates them into something approaching a utopian vision is Wilson's orchestrations: brief bridge melodies, youthful harmonies [...] and an enthralling profusion of instrumental colors." Dominique Leone of Pitchfork declared, "As the mythical follow-up to Pet Sounds, it delivers, and despite his age, Wilson's voice even sounds fantastic, still carrying the weight of these angelic melodies." The Village Voices Tom Smucker felt that it might go on to be considered "album of the year" and described it as "the first successfully conceptualized Beach Boys release since Kokomo, the most moving since Pet Sounds, and the funniest since Smiley Smile".

In Britain, The Guardians Alexis Petridis wrote that news of the album's release caused "an outbreak of mild hysteria" and provoked a journalist from the newspaper to solicit an opinion from the British government, who then supplied a comment from defense secretary Geoff Hoon. Petridis concluded, "Despite the hype, it is hard not to be impressed with the new Smile.  [...] the songs Wilson wrote for Smile still sound like nothing else rock music has ever produced. Its release may not warrant a quote from the defence secretary, but only the hardest heart would not be gladdened by its contents."

NMEs reviewer compared BWPS favorably to Sergei Prokofiev's Lieutenant Kijé ("its interweaved and repeated melodic strands"), Miles Davis' Kind of Blue ("its sheer contemplative beauty"), and the work of George Gershwin and Aaron Copland ("its appropriation of American folk"). In his review for Mojo, Mark Paytress rated BWPS higher than the Beatles' Sgt. Pepper's Lonely Hearts Club Band, as well as any "latter-day art-rock classic, say, Radiohead's OK Computer". Acknowledging the "issues of authenticity that arise out of this 'reconstruction'", he added, "as someone with a small collection of Smile(s) — and thus with one eyebrow sharply raised — I'm amazed how easy it is to believe that this is, perhaps, the genuine Smile."

Less favorably, music critic Paul Morley felt that BWPS represented "a breathtaking example of ultimately banal thinkers attempting self-consciously to make art, a square version of freaking out, musically sophisticated, aesthetically conservative [...] I needed a quick shower of Ramones, Dre and Hendrix afterwards, just to rinse away the clingy bits of fake myth." John Bush of AllMusic believed BWPS was "a remarkably unified, irresistible piece of pop music", yet decreed that it was "no musical watershed on par with Sgt. Pepper's [...] or Wilson's masterpiece, Pet Sounds". Writing in his 2005 book about Smile, Domenic Priore opined, "The recording sessions for the album at Sunset Sound came and went very quickly, and the mix suffers because of this; the emphasis on bass is not what it should be, and the tracks should breathe more. Some felt that there was too much singing, compared with the instrumental texture of the original tapes."

BWPS received three nominations for the 2005 Grammy Awards, including Best Pop Vocal Album and Best Engineered Album, Non-Classical (for Mark Linett). It won one Grammy, in the category of Best Rock Instrumental Performance for "Mrs. O'Leary's Cow". Smile also finished in second place in the Pazz & Jop, an annual critics poll run by The Village Voice. Pitchfork named it fifth best album of 2004 and the 25th best album released between 2000 and 2004.

Beach Boys' response and lawsuit

Mike Love gave his thoughts on the album in a November 2004 interview: "I guess it's a good thing for Brian to do. A friend sent me a copy, but I haven't had time to hear it yet because we've been on tour." In an earlier interview, he had said he would have no interest in listening to the album and, citing the legal concept of "corporate opportunity", mentioned that it had possibly infringed on the Beach Boys' intellectual property rights. Love argued that, because the group had collectively paid for the 1960s recording sessions and all contributed work on the original tracks, "I would have thought it would have been more honorable to put it together as the Beach Boys."

In many interviews he gave around the album's release, Wilson disparaged the Beach Boys, calling them inferior to his current band. In a 2007 interview, Love expressed that he was disappointed to hear about Wilson's remarks. "I'm glad that he's happy with the people he's performing with, but, you know, I think it's sad that he thinks that. My personal feeling is that the original group recordings on Smile have got to be better." Bruce Johnston took offense as well, writing in an email to biographer Peter Ames Carlin: "I spent years showing full support for Brian, but now that's all changed because of his current point of view." Johnston said of the album in a 2008 interview, "I think as an exercise in keeping [Wilson] occupied, it's interesting. [...] I talk to him every once in a while. But I'm never going to tell him that I'll take Pet Sounds over what he's doing now."

One of the promotions for the album was a free CD issued through the Mail on Sunday in September 2004. The 10-track compilation included Beach Boys songs Wilson had recently rerecorded, five of which he coauthored with Love. The Mail on Sunday distributed 2.6 million copies of the compilation. In November 2005, Love filed a lawsuit in which he claimed the promotion hurt the sales of the original recordings. Love's suit was dismissed in 2007 when a judge determined that there were "no triable issues of material fact".

Al Jardine said in 2013 that he "didn't give it a whole lot of thought; I didn't want to go there at that time. They were good enough to send me a copy.  So I dropped the needle, as they used to say, and listened to a few cuts, and it was very nice. But there's nothin' like the [vintage recordings]."

Retrospective assessments and legacy

Although critics widely referred to Wilson's 2004 version as the Smile album completed, many fans disputed the notion. Bootleggers continued to compile their own versions of the Beach Boys' album. In 2011, The Smile Sessions was released containing an approximation of what the band's finished album might have sounded like, using BWPS as a blueprint. Linett co-produced the compilation with Wilson. According to Sahanaja, Wilson "lobbied hard" for the album's sequence to be based on BWPS. In a 2015 interview, Wilson stated that he ultimately preferred his solo version.

Reviewing BWPS on the tenth anniversary of its release, Chris Shields of the St. Cloud Times wrote that "the sequencing raised a question mark or two, and there were mixing quibbles (I would have loved to hear more bass), but [...] [t]he lyrical beauty, the majesty of the music, the shifting (yet somehow fixed) meanings that intertwine throughout it all, still elate me, still fill me with hope and joy." PopMatters  contributor Sean Murphy opined that the album was "crucial", but rendered "less significant" with the availability of The Smile Sessions. Writing for NewMusicBox, Frank Oteri called BWPS "a wonderful album, but it is also not quite right. It is not and can never be a substitute for SMiLE". Music historian Clinton Heylin, who felt that the original Smile recordings failed to live up to the myth, characterized BWPS as "a pale shadow full of digital tweaks, and precious little sweet inspiration; showing if anything that there never was a realised record".

In 2009, BWPS was named the 88th best album of the decade by Rolling Stone. In 2010, it was included in the book 1001 Albums You Must Hear Before You Die. In 2020, it was ranked number 399 on Rolling Stones list of "The 500 Greatest Albums of All Time". The editors wrote, "Close your eyes and you can imagine how it might've changed the world in 1968 , but with Wilson's influence still all over scads of indie bands in 2004, it sounds and feels majestically modern." In 2022, it was ranked number 102 on Uncuts list of the greatest albums released since 1997, as well as number 21 on Rolling Stones list of the greatest concept albums in history.

Track listing

Set list

The songs performed at the Royal Festival Hall shows in February 2004.

First set (acoustic)
 "And Your Dream Comes True"
 "Surfer Girl"
 "In My Room"
 "Hawaii"
 "Keep An Eye On Summer"
 "Please Let Me Wonder"
 "Good Timin'"
 "You're Welcome"

First set (full instrumentation)
"Time to Get Alone"
"Sloop John B"
"Row Your Boat"
"God Only Knows"
"Soul Searchin'"
"California Girls"
"Catch a Wave"
"Dance, Dance, Dance"
"City Blues"
"Sail On, Sailor"

Smile – same running order as album track list

Encore
"Do It Again"
"I Get Around"
"Help Me Rhonda"
 "Barbara Ann"
 "Surfin' U.S.A."
 "Fun, Fun, Fun"
 "Love and Mercy"

Personnel

Per the album's liner notes.

The Brian Wilson Band

 Brian Wilson – vocals, keyboards
 Scott Bennett – vocals, keyboards, mallets, guitar
 Nelson Bragg – vocals, percussion, whistles, celery
 Jeffrey Foskett – vocals, guitar, hammer
 Probyn Gregory – vocals, guitar, brass, Tannerin, whistles
 Jim Hines – drums, mallets, saw, sound effects
 Bob Lizik – bass guitar, guitar, beret
 Paul Mertens – woodwinds, saxophone, harmonica, semi-conductor
 Taylor Mills – vocals, power drill, leg-slap
 Darian Sahanaja – vocals, keyboards, mallets, drill
 Nick Walusko – vocals, guitar

Stockholm Strings 'n' Horns

 Staffan Findin – bass trombone
 Andreas Forsman – violin
 Erik Holm – viola
 Anna Landberg – cello
 Malin-My Nilsson – violin
 Björn Samuelsson – trombone
 Victor Sand – saxophone, flute, clarinet
 Markus Sandlund – cello

Production and technical staff

 Kevin Deane – assistant engineer
 Mark Linett – engineer, mixing
 Mark London – package design and art
 Dennis Loren – graphic layouts
 Bob Ludwig – mastering
 Pete Magdaleno – assistant engineer
 Daniel S. McCoy – assistant engineer
 Brian Wilson – arranger, producer

Charts

Certifications

Notes

References

Bibliography

Further reading
Contemporary articles

External links
 
 

2004 albums
2005 direct-to-video films
Albums produced by Brian Wilson
Brian Wilson albums
Concert films
Concept albums
Nonesuch Records albums
Psychedelic pop albums
The Beach Boys music
Self-covers albums